Coulommiers is a railway station serving the town Coulommiers, Seine-et-Marne department, northern France. It is the terminus of a branch line from Gretz-Armainvilliers (on the line from Gretz-Armainvilliers to Sézanne) to Coulommiers.

External links

 

Railway stations in Seine-et-Marne
Railway stations in France opened in 1863